Gordon Stewart may refer to:

People
 Gordon Stewart (cricketer) (1906–1984), Australian cricketer
 Gordon Stewart (epidemiologist) (1919–2016), Scottish epidemiologist
 Gordon Stewart (footballer) (1927–1980), South African footballer
 Gordon Curran Stewart (1939–2014), American speechwriter, academic, businessman and publisher
 Gordon Stewart (organist), British organist, conductor and teacher
 Gordon Neil Stewart (1912–1999), Australian writer
 Gordon "Butch" Stewart (1941-2021), Jamaican hotelier and businessman
 St George Henry Rathborne (1854–1938), who wrote under this pseudonym

Fictional characters
 Gordon Stewart (Home and Away), a character on the Australian soap opera

See also
 Gordon Stuart (disambiguation)
 Stewart Gordon (disambiguation)